A forge is the hearth where the blacksmith keeps the fire for heating metals to be formed by plastic deformation, usually with hammer on an anvil.

Forge may also refer to:

Industry
 Forging, the process of deforming a metal workpiece by working with localized compressive forces
 Finery forge, a works where pig iron was fined and forged (drawn out) into bars of wrought iron
 Bloomery, a forge where iron ore was smelted to produce wrought iron

Media and arts
 Forge (comics), a mutant superhero in the Marvel Comics universe who is associated with the X-Men
 Forge (Doctor Who), a fictional black operations organisation from the Big Finish Productions audio plays based on the long-running British science fiction television series Doctor Who
 Forge, a book of poetry by Jan Zwicky, 2011
 Forge,  a 2010, a historical fiction book by Laurie Halse Anderson
 Forge, a website on productivity published by Medium
 The Forge (Goya), a painting by Francisco Goya
 "The Forge" (Star Trek: Enterprise), an episode of Star Trek: Enterprise
 The Forge, a novel by Radclyffe Hall published in 1924
 The Forge, a British TV production company founded by George Faber
 Forged (film), a 2010 drama film

Computer gaming
 Forge (level editor), a map editor for the Halo series of video games
 A planned but canceled sequel to LucasArts's adventure game Loom
 Forge (video game), a game by Dark Vale Studios

Roleplaying gaming

 The Forge (roleplaying game website), dedicated to indie roleplaying games

Computer software
 Forge (software), a collaborative software development management system
 Sound Forge, a digital audio editing and creation suite

Places
 Forge, Cornwall, England
 Forge, Powys, Wales
 Clifton Forge, Virginia, USA
 Pigeon Forge, Tennessee, USA
 Valley Forge, Pennsylvania, USA

Other uses
 Andrew Forge (1923-2002), English painter
 FORGE Program, a United Nations-sanctioned NGO that links Western students to African refugees
 Forge FC, a Canadian soccer club
 The Forge (restaurant), a restaurant in Miami Beach, Florida
 The Forge Shopping Centre, Glasgow, Scotland
 Ponds Forge, sports centre in Sheffield, England

See also 
 Forge World
 The Forge of God
 Forgery (disambiguation)
 La Forge (disambiguation)
 Old Forge (disambiguation)
 Forgy (disambiguation)